Günter Mittag (8 October 1926 – 18 March 1994) was a German member of parliament, secretary of the Socialist Unity Party of Germany (SED), and a central figure in East Germany's command economy.

Biography

Born to a working-class family in Stettin (now Szczecin). After completing vocational education with the Reichsbahn Mittag served in a flak regiment of the Wehrmacht in the Second World War.  He joined the Communist Party of Germany (KPD) in 1945, became a member of the SED in 1946 and by 1958, when he had earned his doctorate with a dissertation entitled "Die Überlegenheit der sozialistischen Organisation und Leitung im Eisenbahnwesen der DDR gegenüber dem kapitalistischen Eisenbahnwesen" (en: The Superiority of Socialist Organisation and Performance in the Railroads of the GDR to the Capitalist Railroads), he became Secretary of the Economic Commission at the Politbüro.  In 1963 he became a member of parliament and (until 1971, and then again from 1979 to 1989) a member of the State Council of the German Democratic Republic (GDR).

Also in 1963 he became Leiter des Büros für Industrie- und Bauwesen des ZK ("Head of the Office for Industry and Construction of the Central Committee of the SED").  He and Erich Apel designed the New System for Economic Management and Planning (NÖSPL), to modernise and streamline the formerly-bureaucratic economy of the GDR.  This was politically controversial and only very partially implemented.

In 1976 Mittag became Secretary for the Economy of the ZK (Central Committee of the SED).  He advocated, and implemented, strict economic controls throughout his tenure. His leadership style was controversial, involving confrontations with ministers and demands for the summary dismissal of certain officials.  He was particularly close to Franz Josef Strauß, and in the early 1980s arranged the so-called "Billion Loan" from West Germany.

Mittag was severely diabetic and in 1984 one of his lower legs was amputated: the other was removed in 1989.  He left office after a controversy that resulted in him being taken into custody, but he was released on health grounds.  In 1991 he was accused of using government funds for a private home.

He received honorary doctorates from the University of Tokyo and the University of Leoben in Austria.

Sources
 Przybylski, Peter: Tatort Politburo, 1992, 
 Hertle, Hans-Hermann: Prior to the bankruptcy of the GDR: documents of the Politburo of the CC of the SED from 1988 to the failure of the "Economic and social policy" (The Schürer / Mittag controversy).  In an interview with Gerhard Schürer, Berlin 1991
 Janson, Carl-Heinz: Gravedigger of the GDR. How Günter Mittag ruined state, Düsseldorf 1991
 Mittag, Günter:  At any price. In the tension between two systems, Berlin / Weimar, 1991
 Mittag, Günter: "It breaks my heart': Spiegel-interview with the former East German economic czar Günter Mittag on his policies and his errors, in Der Spiegel, 37/1991, p. 88-104.

Notes

External links
 
 Biographie: Günter Mittag, 1926–1994
 DDR im WWW. Personen. Günter Mittag.
 Chronik-Biographie: Günter Mittag

1926 births
1994 deaths
Politicians from Szczecin
People from the Province of Pomerania
Communist Party of Germany politicians
Members of the Politburo of the Central Committee of the Socialist Unity Party of Germany
Members of the State Council of East Germany
Members of the 4th Volkskammer
Members of the 5th Volkskammer
Members of the 6th Volkskammer
Members of the 7th Volkskammer
Members of the 8th Volkskammer
Members of the 9th Volkskammer
German hunters
Free German Trade Union Federation members
Luftwaffenhelfer
German amputees